Getter Saar may refer to:
 Getter Saar (badminton)
 Getter Saar (footballer)